Hafliði Másson (died 1130;;) was an Icelandic goði and chieftain in the eleventh to twelfth centuries. He is best known for his dealings with Þorgils Oddason (1080-1151) and for having Iceland's law codified as the text that came to be known as Grágás.
Hafliði was the son of the goði Már Húnröðarson from  Breiðabólstaður í Vesturhópi; they claimed direct patrilineal descent from the settler Ævar gamli Ketilsson, whose dynasty was known as the Æverlingar.

References

Other Sources
 Konan á Breiðabólstað í Vesturhópi. Sunndagsblað Tímans, 19. August 1962. http://timarit.is/view_page_init.jsp?pageId=3550838
 Sturlungasaga I (Reykjavík: Svart á hvítu, 1988), pp. 7–46 (Þorgilssaga og Hafliða)
 Lúðvík Ingvarsson, Goðorð og goðorðsmenn, 3 vols (Egilsstaðir 1987), III, 197-200 and 300.

11th-century Icelandic people
12th-century Icelandic people
1130 deaths
Goðar